Shireen or Shirin is a female name of Arabic and Persian origin.

People 
 Shireen Abu Akleh (1971–2022), Palestinian journalist 
 Shireen Benjamin (born 1988), West African beauty queen
 Shereen Bhan (born 1976), Indian journalist and news anchor
 Shireen Chambers (born 1962), British forester
 Shireen Crutchfield (born 1970), American actress
 Shireen Avis Fisher, a justice of the Special Court for Sierra Leone
 Shireen Hunter (born 1945), Iranian political scientist
 Shireen Mazari, Pakistani political scientist
 Shireen Ritchie, Baroness Ritchie of Brompton (1945–2012), a Conservative Councillor in the UK
 Shireen Sapiro (born 1991), South African Paralympic swimmer
 Shireen Sungkar (born 1992), Indonesian actress

Other uses 
 Tareq wa Shireen, a Jordanian animated television series
 Khosrow and Shirin, a Persian tragic romance by Nizami Ganjavi (1141−1209)
 Shireen Baratheon, a minor character in the Game of Thrones book and television series